The 2002 G.I. Joe's 200 was the sixth round of the 2002 CART FedEx Champ Car World Series season, held on June 16, 2002 at Portland International Raceway in Portland, Oregon.

Qualifying results

Race

Caution flags

Notes 

 New Race Record Cristiano da Matta 2:03:19.113
 Average Speed 105.381 mph

External links
 Friday Qualifying Results
 Saturday Qualifying Results
 Race Results

Portland
Grand Prix of Portland